The Women's dual moguls competition at the FIS Freestyle Ski and Snowboarding World Championships 2023 was held on 26 February 2023.

Results

Finals

Top half

Section 1

Section 2

Bottom half

Section 3

Section 4

References

Women's dual moguls